The Czech National Football League (FNL), currently known as Fortuna národní liga due to sponsorship reasons, is the second level professional association football league in the Czech Republic. Before 2013 it was known as 2. liga or Druhá liga. The top two teams each season are eligible for promotion to the Czech First League.

The league replaced the I.ČNL (I. Česká národní liga; First Czech National League), which had been established following the end of the nationwide Czechoslovak Second League in 1977. The league became known as simply II. liga (Second League) in 1993 following the establishment of the Czech Republic as an independent state.

Structure
There are 16 clubs in the FNL. During the season, which runs from August to May or June, with a winter break between November and February or March, each club plays each of the other clubs twice (once at home, once away) and is awarded three points for a win, one for a draw and zero for a loss. Teams are ranked by total points, then goal difference and then goals scored. At the end of each season the top two teams are promoted to the First League, providing they obtain a license and meet league requirements, and are replaced by the two teams that finished bottom of that division. Similarly the two teams that finished at the bottom of the FNL are relegated to either the Bohemian Football League or the Moravian–Silesian Football League, based on geographical criteria. In turn, the champions of each of these regional divisions are promoted to the FNL.

In the 1993–94 season the league was played with 16 teams, before expanding to 18 teams in the 1994–95 season. Since 1995, the league has always been played with 16 teams, but on two occasions a team did not fulfil its fixtures and the full 30 rounds were not completed. Firstly in the 1997–98 Czech 2. Liga as Ústí nad Labem did not fulfil their fixtures and their results were cancelled, and secondly in the 2004–05 Czech 2. Liga as Bohemians' results were expunged after playing only the first half of the season.

Participating teams in 2021–22
The following 16 clubs were competing in the 2021–22 Czech National Football League.

FNL champions

Teams promoted to the First League since 1993 
 1993: Viktoria Žižkov, Petra Drnovice, Viktoria Plzeň, Union Cheb, Slovan Liberec, Svit Zlín 
 1994: Sklobižu Jablonec nad Nisou, Švarc Benešov
 1995: Uherské Hradiště, Ostroj Opava
 1996: FC Karviná, FK Teplice, Bohemians Prague 
 1997: FC Dukla Příbram, AFK Atlantic Lázně Bohdaneč
 1998: FK Chmel Blšany, FC Karviná
 1999: Bohemians Prague, SK České Budějovice
 2000: Synot Staré Město, FC Viktoria Plzeň
 2001: FC Hradec Králové, SFC Opava
 2002: SK Dynamo České Budějovice, FC Tescoma Zlín
 2003: FC Viktoria Plzeň, SFC Opava
 2004: FK Mladá Boleslav, FK Drnovice
 2005: FK SIAD Most, FC Vysočina Jihlava, FC Viktoria Plzeň 
 2006: SK Kladno, SK Dynamo České Budějovice
 2007: Viktoria Žižkov, Bohemians 1905
 2008: Bohemians (Střížkov) Prague, FK Marila Příbram
 2009: Bohemians 1905, 1. FC Slovácko 
 2010: FC Hradec Králové, FK Ústí nad Labem
 2011: FK Dukla Prague, FK Viktoria Žižkov
 2012: FC Vysočina Jihlava, FC Zbrojovka Brno 
 2013: 1. SC Znojmo, Bohemians 1905
 2014: SK Dynamo České Budějovice, FC Hradec Králové
 2015: SK Sigma Olomouc, FC Fastav Zlín
 2016: MFK Karviná, FC Hradec Králové
 2017: SK Sigma Olomouc, FC Baník Ostrava
 2018: SFC Opava, 1.FK Příbram
 2019: SK Dynamo České Budějovice
 2020: FK Pardubice, FC Zbrojovka Brno
 2021: FC Hradec Králové
 2022: FC Zbrojovka Brno

Top scorers
All information in this table can be found at except for the 2003–04 season, which is sourced from the following link.

Notes

References

External links

Information on ČMFS website
 League321.com – Czech Republic football league tables, records & statistics database. 

 
2
1993 establishments in the Czech Republic
Sports leagues established in 1993
Second level football leagues in Europe
Professional sports leagues in the Czech Republic